Niels Lillelund (born 1965) is a Danish writer, cultural journalist, op-ed columnist and restaurant critic at Jyllands-Posten.

He is the author of several books, among those a series of crime novels about the antiquarian book dealer and ex-policeman Erik Andersen, who is forced to supplement his income as a private detective.

The novels introduce very different environments and people.

The first novel, Rouletten, takes place in and around a new casino, the first in Denmark. Lillelund worked there for some months before writing his novel.

The second, Besat til anden side, is about a management consultant firm, while the third novel, Den Amerikanske Samler (The American Collector) takes us to New York in a hunt for a rare copy of Søren Kierkegaard's Either/Or. These were followed by Manden der ville vaere sund, in which the narrator tries many different methods of improving his health.

The latest novel, Bibendum, takes place among wine writers and producers, a world well known to Lillelund, who has a weekly column about wine.

Lillelund holds an MA degree in Nordic literature and his non-fiction works include a book about the cultural history of poker, Gotham City - Fortællinger fra New York (Gotham City - Tales from New York), a book about the city of New York, and Rhône vinene (Rhône wines), a book about the wines of the Rhône Valley.

Bibliography 
 Kvindedrømmer, 1999
 Rouletten, 1999
 Besat til anden side, 2000
 Den amerikanske samler, 2001
 Manden der ville være sund: stræbsomme fortællinger, 2001
 Alt lykkes i en gasovn: en bog om at lave mad, 2002
 Rhône vinene, 2004
 Bibendum, 2007 
 Mr. Time Manager: Claus Møller og hans tid, 2008
 Poker: historien om et kortspil, 2008
 Gotham City: fortællinger fra New York, 2010
 Vinene fra Rhône, 2013

References

Living people
1965 births
Danish male writers
20th-century Danish journalists
21st-century Danish journalists
Restaurant critics